Lori E. Sweeney (born October 8, 1964) is an American former soccer player who made four appearances for the United States women's national team.

Career
Sweeney played for the Green River Gators and Puget Sound Loggers during her college career. She made her international debut for the United States in the team's inaugural match on August 18, 1985 in a friendly match against Italy. In total, she made four appearances for the U.S., earning her final cap on August 24, 1985 in a friendly match against Denmark.

Personal life
She is married to Mathieu Sweeney.

Career statistics

International

References

1964 births
Living people
American women's soccer players
United States women's international soccer players
Women's association football midfielders
University of Puget Sound alumni
21st-century American women